David Fluellen Jr. (born January 29, 1992) is a former American football running back. He was signed as an undrafted free agent by the Philadelphia Eagles after the 2014 NFL Draft. He played college football at Toledo.

Early years
Fluellen attended and played high school football at Lockport High School.

College career
Fluellen attended and played college football at Toledo. As a freshman in 2010, he had 38 carries for 224 rushing yards and one rushing touchdown. As a sophomore in 2011, he had 97 carries for 493 rushing yards and four rushing touchdowns to go along with 16 receptions for 155 receiving yards and two receiving touchdowns. As a junior in 2012, he had 259 carries for 1,498 rushing yards and 13 rushing touchdowns to go along with 32 receptions for 246 receiving yards. As a senior in 2013, he had 167 carries for 1,121 rushing yards and ten rushing touchdowns to go along with 27 receptions for 222 receiving yards.

Collegiate statistics

Professional career

Philadelphia Eagles
Following the 2014 NFL Draft, Fluellen was signed by the Philadelphia Eagles. Fluellen was traded to the Indianapolis Colts for placekicker Cody Parkey on August 20, 2014.

Indianapolis Colts
Fluellen was waived by the Colts on August 30, 2014.

Tennessee Titans

2015 season
On July 29, 2015, Fluellen signed with the Tennessee Titans. He was released at the end of roster cuts and was added to the Titans' practice squad where he spent his entire rookie season.

2016 season
On September 2, 2016, Fluellen was released by the Titans as part of final roster cuts. The next day, he was signed to the Titans' practice squad. He was promoted to the active roster on November 7, 2016. He was waived by the Titans on December 12, 2016, and was signed to the practice squad the next day. He signed a reserve/future contract with the Titans on January 2, 2017.

2017 season

On September 17, 2017, in Week 2, Fluellen had the first three rushes of his career, which went for 18 yards, in a 37–16 victory over the Jacksonville Jaguars. Overall, he finished the 2017 season with four carries for 21 rushing yards. The Titans finished second in the AFC South with a 9–7 record and made the playoffs as a Wild Card team. In the Wild Card Round against the Kansas City Chiefs, Fluellen returned a kickoff for 12 yards right before halftime. The Titans won 22-21.

2018 season
Fluellen made his first rush of the season, a two-yarder, in Week 7 during a narrow 20-19 loss against the Los Angeles Chargers. During Week 10 against the New England Patriots, he rushed three times for 14 yards before exiting the 34-10 victory with a knee injury.  He missed the next five games before being placed on injured reserve on December 20, 2018. In seven games, he had four carries for 16 yards on the season.

2019 season
On March 11, 2019, Fluellen re-signed with the Titans. He was placed on injured reserve with a knee injury on October 4.

Personal life
Fluellen, a native of Lockport, New York, is married to KSAZ-TV anchor/reporter Desiree Wiley. He has 5 sisters and a brother. His brother, Jhamal, was a running back at Syracuse and Maine. Fluellen enjoys bowling, mini-golf and watching movies with his wife in his free time. He hosted the first annual David Fluellen Football Camp in June 2018 at his high school alma mater in New York, Lockport High School.

References

External links
Toledo Rockets bio
Tennessee Titans bio
Rotoworld profile

1992 births
Living people
Players of American football from New York (state)
American football running backs
Toledo Rockets football players
Tennessee Titans players
Indianapolis Colts players
Philadelphia Eagles players
People from Lockport, New York